Littorina saxatilis, common name the rough periwinkle, is a species of small sea snail, a marine gastropod mollusc in the family Littorinidae, the winkles or periwinkles. First identified in the 1700s, it has been misidentified as a new species 112 times.

Distribution
This species is native to the shores of the North Atlantic Ocean, including Hudson Bay, Baffin Island, Greenland, and the Barents Sea, south along the American East Coast to Chesapeake Bay, and along the European coast to the Straits of Gibraltar.

This species has also been introduced to San Francisco Bay, on the West Coast of the United States, where it was first observed in 1992.

Shell description
The shell in life often appears green with algae, but the shell itself can be white, red, or brown, sometimes with checkered lines. The shell has 4–5 whorls. Maximum recorded shell length is 19 mm.

Ecology

Habitat
This species frequently lives in salt marshes. it can also be found in crevices of intertidal bedrock, in empty barnacle shells, and under rocks. Like many other periwinkles, this species can survive long exposures out of the water.

The species has been recorded alive from depth range 0 – 46 m or up to 183 m (for shells only).

In the exposed Galician coast in the Northern Spain, two well differentiated ecotypes are adapted to different shore levels and habitats. The RB ecotype (Ridged and Banded) lives on barnacles in the upper shore. This ecotype displays a larger and more robust shell to resist the attack from predators such as crabs, and a smaller shell aperture in order to reduce the desiccation due to high sunshine exposure. The SU ecotype (Smooth and Unbanded) is found at the lower shore living on mussels. This ecotype shows a smaller and thinner shell with a wider shell aperture to allocate a relatively larger muscular foot providing a higher ability to avoid the dislodgment caused by the heavy wave action. Both ecotypes coexist in an intermediate habitat at the middle shore.

Genetics
Littorina saxatilis has been shown to be an excellent model system for speciation genetics. In the seminal 2001 paper, Wilding et al demonstrated, using amplified fragment length polymorphism, that the low shore M form of the species were divergent from the high shore H form at number of loci despite gene flow between the forms.

Feeding habits
This snail is a herbivore which grazes on the surface of rocks and mud flats.

Life cycle 
The marine snail Littorina saxatilis has separate sexes, internal fertilization, and a brood pouch with non-planktonic shelled embryos.

Synonyms

 Litorina groenlandica Menke, 1830
 Litorina incarnata Philippi, 1846
 Litorina marmorata L. Pfeiffer, 1839
 Litorina sulcata Menke, 1830
 Littorina castanea Deshayes in Deshayes & Milne Edwards, 1843
 Littorina danieli Locard, 1886
 Littorina groenlandica (Menke, 1830)
 Littorina neglecta Bean, 1844
 Littorina nervillei Dautzenberg, 1893
 Littorina nervillei var. major Pallary in Seurat, 1924
 Littorina nigrolineata Gray, 1839
 Littorina palliata var. turritella Schlesch, 1916
 Littorina rudis (Maton, 1797) (synonym)
 Littorina rudis f. elatior Middendorff, 1849
 Littorina rudis var. albida Dautzenberg, 1887
 Littorina rudis var. alticola Dacie, 1917
 Littorina rudis var. aurantia Dautzenberg, 1887
 Littorina rudis var. brevis Dautzenberg, 1887
 Littorina rudis var. conoidea Schlesch, 1916
 Littorina rudis var. fasciata Dautzenberg, 1887
 Littorina rudis var. finmarchia Herzenstein, 1885
 Littorina rudis var. globosa Jeffreys, 1865
 Littorina rudis var. globosa Martel, 1901
 Littorina rudis var. laevis Jeffreys, 1865
 Littorina rudis var. major Dautzenberg & P. Fisher, 1912
 Littorina rudis var. rubescens Monterosato, 1878
 Littorina rudis var. scotia S.M. Smith, 1979
 Littorina rudis var. similis Jeffreys, 1865
 Littorina rudis var. sulcata Martel, 1901
 Littorina rudis var. tenebrosapallida L.E. Adams, 1896
 Littorina rudis var. tessellata Dautzenberg, 1893
 Littorina saxatile La Roque, 1953
 Littorina saxatile saxatile La Roque, 1953
 Littorina saxatilis Johnston, 1842
 Littorina saxatilis f. abbreviata Dautzenberg & P. Fisher, 1912
 Littorina saxatilis f. conoidea Dautzenberg & P. Fisher, 1912
 Littorina saxatilis f. elongata Dautzenberg & P. Fisher, 1912
 Littorina saxatilis f. minor Dautzenberg & P. Fisher, 1912
 Littorina saxatilis groenlandica (Menke, 1830)
 Littorina saxatilis groenlandica var. sculpta Schlesch, 1931
 Littorina saxatilis jugosa Montagu, 1803
 Littorina saxatilis jugosa var. bynei Dautzenberg & P. Fisher, 1912
 Littorina saxatilis jugosa var. tenuis James, 1968
 Littorina saxatilis nigrolineata Gray, 1839
 Littorina saxatilis rudis (Maton, 1797)
 Littorina saxatilis rudis var. rudissimoides James, 1968
 Littorina saxatilis scotia Graham, 1988
 Littorina saxatilis tenebrosa (Montagu, 1803)
 Littorina saxatilis tenebrosa var. biinterrupta Fischer-Piette & Gaillard, 1963
 Littorina saxatilis tenebrosa var. bizonaria James, 1963
 Littorina saxatilis tenebrosa var. elata Dautzenberg & P. Fisher, 1912
 Littorina saxatilis tenebrosa var. maculata Fischer-Piette & Gaillard, 1963
 Littorina saxatilis var. clarilineata Fischer-Piette & Gaillard, 1971
 Littorina saxatilis var. flammulata Dautzenberg & P. Fisher, 1912
 Littorina saxatilis var. fulva Dautzenberg & P. Fisher, 1912
 Littorina saxatilis var. fusca Dautzenberg & P. Fisher, 1912
 Littorina saxatilis var. gascae Fischer-Piette & Gaillard, 1971
 Littorina saxatilis var. groenlandica (Menke, 1830)
 Littorina saxatilis var. hieroglyphica Fischer-Piette, Gaillard & Jouin, 1961
 Littorina saxatilis var. interrupta Fischer-Piette, Gaillard & Jouin, 1961
 Littorina saxatilis var. lagunae Barnes, 1993
 Littorina saxatilis var. lineata Dautzenberg & P. Fisher, 1912
 Littorina saxatilis var. lugubris Dautzenberg & P. Fisher, 1912
 Littorina saxatilis var. nigra Fischer-Piette & Gaillard, 1971
 Littorina saxatilis var. nojensis Fischer-Piette & Gaillard, 1964
 Littorina saxatilis var. rubra Fischer-Piette & Gaillard, 1971
 Littorina saxatilis var. rubrolineata Fischer-Piette, Gaillard & Delmas, 1967
 Littorina saxatilis var. salvati Fischer-Piette, Gaillard & Delmas, 1967
 Littorina saxatilis var. sanguinea Coen, 1933
 Littorina saxatilis var. sellensis Fischer-Piette & Gaillard, 1964
 Littorina saxatilis var. tractibus Fischer-Piette, Gaillard & Jouin, 1961
 Littorina saxatilis var. trifasciata Dautzenberg & P. Fisher, 1912
 Littorina saxatilis zonata Daniel, 1883
 Littorina saxoides Nardo, 1847
 Littorina simplex Reeve, 1857
 Littorina tenebrosa (Montagu, 1803)
 Littorina tenebrosa f. elatior Middendorff, 1849
 Littorina tenebrosa var. costulata Middendorff, 1849
 Littorina tenebrosa var. densecostulata Middendorff, 1849
 Littorina tenebrosa var. grisolacteus Middendorff, 1849
 Littorina tenebrosa var. intermedia Forbes & Hanley, 1850
 Littorina tenebrosa var. rubidus Middendorff, 1849
 Littorina tenebrosa var. tessellatus Middendorff, 1849
 Littorina tenebrosa var. zonatus Middendorff, 1849
 Littorina zonaria Bean, 1844
 Nerita rustica Nardo, 1847
 Turbo obligatus Say, 1822
 Turbo rudis Maton, 1797
 Turbo rudissimus Johnston, 1842

See also
Common Periwinkle

References
This article incorporates CC-BY-2.0 text from the reference

Further reading 
 Carvajal-Rodríguez, A.; Conde-Padín, P. & Rolán-Alvarez, E. (2005). "Decomposing shell form into size and shape by geometric morphometric methods in two sympatric ecotypes of Littorina saxatilis. Journal of Molluscan Studies 71: 313–318.
 Galindo, J.; Morán, P. & Rolán-Alvarez, E. (2009). "Comparing geographical genetic differentiation between candidate and noncandidate loci for adaptation strengthens support for parallel ecological divergence in the marine snail Littorina saxatilis". Molecular Ecology 18: 919–930.
 Hayward, P. J.; Ryland, J. S. (Ed.) (1990). The marine fauna of the British Isles and North-West Europe: 1. Introduction and protozoans to arthropods. Clarendon Press: Oxford, UK. . 627 pp.
 Johannesson, B. (1986). "Shell morphology of Littorina saxatilis Olivi the relative importance of physical factors and predation". Journal of Experimental Marine Biology and Ecology 102: 183–195.
 Johannesson, K.; Johannesson, B. & Rolán-Alvarez, E. (1993). "Morphological differentiation and genetic cohesiveness over a micro-environmental gradient in the marine snail Littorina saxatilis". Evolution 47: 1770–1787.
 Reid, D. G. (1989a) "The comparative morphology, phylogeny and evolution of the gastropod family Littorinidae". Philosophical Transactions of the Royal Society of London, Series B 324: 1–110
 Reid, D. G. (1996). Systematics and evolution of Littorina. The Ray Society 463p.
 Rolán-Alvarez, E. (2007). "Sympatric speciation as a by-product of ecological adaptation in the Galicia Littorina saxatilis hybrid zone". Journal of Molluscan Studies 73: 1–10.
 Rolán-Alvarez, E.; Johannesson, K. & Erlandsson, J. (1997). "The maintenance of a cline in the marine snail Littorina saxatilis: the role of home site advantage and hybrid fitness in ecotype formation". Evolution 51: 1838–1847.

External links 

 In the British Isles
 As an invasive species in San Francisco Bay

Littorinidae
Gastropods described in 1792
Taxa named by Giuseppe Olivi